Hao Airport  is an airport on Hao Island in French Polynesia. Its unusually long runway (for the atoll's present population) was constructed to permit large transport aircraft (carrying materials for nuclear tests) to land. Their cargoes would be transported onward to nuclear test sites by ships.

Hao airport was a designated emergency landing site for the NASA Space Shuttle.

Airlines and destinations

Passenger

References

Airports in French Polynesia
Space Shuttle Emergency Landing Sites